Jason Douglas Boe (March 10, 1929 – March 20, 1990) was an American optometrist from Oregon. A native of California, he served as the 47th president of the Oregon State Senate. Prior to serving in the Senate he was a member of the Oregon House of Representatives.

Early life
Jason Boe was born in 1929 in Los Angeles, California. When he turned 24 in 1953, he made his way north to Oregon to attend school at Pacific University, where he earned a doctorate in optometry. It was during his time at Pacific that he met his future wife, Kathryn. They both shared a common interest in classical music and quickly fell in love and married. After Boe earned his doctorate, he and Kathryn moved to Reedsport, Oregon, where he began his optometry practice.

In 1958, Boe successfully sought a seat on the Reedsport City Council.

Legislative career
Boe sought a seat in the Oregon State Legislature, and in 1964 he was elected to the Oregon House of Representatives. He served for three consecutive terms, from 1964 to 1970. He was elected to the Oregon State Senate in 1970 and served there until 1980.

In 1973 (the 57th Oregon Legislative Assembly), he broke up a coalition of conservative Democrats and Republicans to be elected Senate President. In the 1975 session, he was challenged by fellow Democrat Betty Roberts for the position, but prevailed, in part due to the decision of independent Charles Hanlon to join the Democratic Party and support Boe. Boe remained Senate President for four consecutive terms.

President Jimmy Carter appointed Boe to the Advisory Commission on Intergovernmental Relations on October 11, 1979.

Later years
Jason Boe retired from elective office after his 1980 failed bid for Oregon State Treasurer. He later owned Jason Boe & Associates, Inc., an international consulting firm that had offices in both Taiwan and Korea.

Legacy
The Senate wing of the Oregon State Capitol is named in Boe's honor.

In 1997, a stretch of Oregon Route 38 that lies between the communities of Drain and Reedsport was designated the "Jason Boe Corridor".

Electoral history

References

External links
Boe speech from 1977 Wings Dedication

Presidents of the Oregon State Senate
1929 births
1990 deaths
Politicians from Los Angeles
Politicians from Portland, Oregon
Members of the Oregon House of Representatives
Oregon city council members
Pacific University alumni
American optometrists
20th-century American politicians
People from Reedsport, Oregon